Raj Kumar Gupta is a Nepalese politician, belonging to the CPN (UML) currently serving as the member of the 2nd Federal Parliament of Nepal. In the 2022 Nepalese general election, he won the election from Parsa 3 (constituency).

References

Living people
Nepal MPs 2022–present
1971 births